Takkatan Chollada is a famous female Thai singer and dancer. Her birth name is Chonlada Thongchulklang. She was born on 17 May 1983, in Nakhon Ratchasima province. She is the daughter of Soan and Butr Thongchulklang.

She entered entertainment by joining the music contests "First Stage Show", and "Ngao Sieang Luk thung .357) hosted by Radio Station Luk thung FM, with tone song look like  by Pumpuang Duangjan. Next, in 2006, she was a singer for record label Grammy Gold, which is an affiliate company of GMM Grammy until now. She is popular for the song titled "Mai Chai Fan Tham Taen Mai Dai" (ไม่ใช่แฟนทำแทนไม่ได้).

Discography

Album Grammy Gold

Album Tan tan Korporesion

Special albums

Filmography

TV Series

References

1983 births
Living people
Takkatan Chollada
Takkatan Chollada
Takkatan Chollada